is a Japanese manga artist known for creating the manga series Ōmagadoki Dōbutsuen, Barrage and My Hero Academia, all of which have been serialized in Shueisha's shōnen manga magazine Weekly Shōnen Jump. Horikoshi is a graduate of Toho High School and Nagoya University of Arts and is a native of Aichi Prefecture. He was a former assistant for Yasuki Tanaka, creator of the manga series Summer Time Rendering, Hitomi no Catoblepas and Kagijin.

Horikoshi stated that his favorite manga series as a child were Dragon Ball, One Piece and Naruto. He was also influenced by manga artist  (Toto!: The Wonderful Adventure). Horikoshi is also a fan of American superhero comic books, particularly Marvel Comics.

Works

Awards and nominations
In 2015, Horikoshi is the grand prize winner for My Hero Academia on Mando Kobayashi, Kendo Kobayashi's monthly manga variety show where winners are selected on their personal taste.

References

External links
 
  
 

1986 births
Harvey Award winners
Manga artists from Aichi Prefecture
Living people